The men's decathlon event at the 1977 Summer Universiade was held at the Vasil Levski National Stadium in Sofia on 21 and 22 August.

Results

References

Athletics at the 1977 Summer Universiade
1977